The 2012 United States presidential election in South Carolina took place on November 6, 2012, as part of the 2012 United States presidential election in which all 50 states plus the District of Columbia participated. South Carolina voters chose 9 electors to represent them in the Electoral College via a popular vote pitting incumbent Democratic President Barack Obama and his running mate, Vice President Joe Biden, against Republican challenger and former Massachusetts Governor Mitt Romney and his running mate, Congressman Paul Ryan. 

Also on the ballot were Libertarian nominee, former New Mexico Governor Gary Johnson and his running mate, jurist Jim Gray. The left-wing Green Party nominated activist and physician Jill Stein and her running mate, anti-poverty advocate Cheri Honkala. The conservative Constitution Party nominated former U.S. Representative from Virginia Virgil Goode for president, and former Chair of the Constitution Party Jim Clymer for vice president.

Romney defeated Obama in the state by 54.56% to 44.09%, a margin of 10.47%. While the state is generally considered safe for the Republican Party, it remains somewhat competitive due to a high African-American population, the sixth-highest in the country. The majority of the Democratic vote comes from the Black Belt, with areas such as Richland and Charleston counties, home to Columbia and Charleston respectively, providing high margins for the Democrats. However, this support is largely offset by suburban and rural white voters. The state hasn't voted for a Democrat since Jimmy Carter carried it in 1976. Romney also significantly improved on John McCain's 8.97% margin in 2008.

As of 2020, this is the most recent election where the counties of Barnwell, Calhoun, Chester, Colleton, Darlington, and McCormick voted for the Democratic candidate.

Primaries

Democratic
Incumbent President Barack Obama ran unopposed in the Democratic primary and easily won with more than 99% of the vote. The Democratic primary was held on January 28, 2012, one week after the Republican primary.

Republican

The Republican primary was held on January 21, 2012.

During the primary election campaign, the candidates ran on a platform of government reform in Washington. Domestic, foreign and economic policy emerged as the main themes in the election campaign following the onset of the 2008 economic crisis, as well as policies implemented by the Obama administration. This included the Patient Protection and Affordable Care Act, termed "Obamacare" by its opponents, as well as government spending as a whole.

The primary has become one of several key early state nominating contests in the process of choosing the nominee of the Republican Party for the election for President of the United States. It has historically been more important for the Republican Party than for the Democratic Party; from its inception in 1980, until the nomination of former Massachusetts Governor Mitt Romney in 2012, the winner of the Republican presidential primary had gone on to win the nomination. As of 2012, the primary has cemented its place as the "First in the South" primary for both parties. Former Speaker of the House Newt Gingrich was declared the winner of the race as soon as polls closed, however, Mitt Romney went on to win the nomination.

Date
The 2012 South Carolina Republican primary was tentatively scheduled to occur on February 28, 2012, much later than the date in 2008, which almost immediately followed the beginning of the year in January 2008. On September 29, 2011, the entire schedule of caucuses and primaries was disrupted, however, when it was announced that the Republican Party of Florida had decided to move up its primary to January 31, in an attempt to bring attention to its own primary contest, and attract the presidential candidates to visit the state. Because of the move, the Republican National Committee decided to strip Florida of half of its delegates. Also as a result, the South Carolina Republican Party, along with Iowa, New Hampshire and Nevada then sought to move their primaries and caucuses back into early January. All but Nevada, who agreed to follow Florida, confirmed their caucus and primary dates to take place throughout January, with South Carolina deciding to hold their contest on January 21, 2012. It is an open primary, meaning all registered voters can participate in the primary.

Ballot access
Nine candidates appeared on the presidential primary ballot. South Carolina had only 25 delegates up for grabs because it moved its primary to January 21. Eleven delegates were awarded for the statewide winner, Newt Gingrich, and two additional delegates were awarded to the winner of each of the seven congressional districts. Six districts were won by Gingrich, and one by Romney, giving Gingrich twelve additional delegates and Romney two delegates.

Polling

Results

There were 2,804,231 registered voters, for a turnout of 21.60%.

General election

Results

By county

Counties that flipped from Republican to Democratic 
 Darlington (largest city: Hartsville)

By congressional district
Romney won 6 of 7 congressional districts.

See also

 South Carolina primary
Republican Party presidential debates, 2012
Republican Party presidential primaries, 2012
 Results of the 2012 Republican Party presidential primaries
 South Carolina Republican Party

References

External links

The Green Papers: for South Carolina
The Green Papers: Major state elections in chronological order

United States President
South Carolina
The Colbert Report
2012